Akademiya Futbolu SC Kyiv is a Ukrainian professional football club from Kyiv. The club is based at the Kyiv's elite Pechersk neighborhood based at the former Kyiv Arsenal factory stadium.

History 
The club's first team was created in 2020 based on DYuSSh Chаmpion Kyiv (sports school) and since 2017 was named as Chаmpion of Kyiv playing in competitions among under-19 teams (U–19 Championship). The club debuted with its first team in the 2020–21 Ukrainian Football Amateur League playing its home games in the Kyiv's suburb of Vyshneve.

The club plans to finish its sports complex in August 2021 that should accommodate athletes of six various types of sports. The new sports complex will accommodate up to 1,500 stadium spectators. It also will accommodate athletes of association football, tennis, martial arts, chess, cybersports, and athletics.

Names
 2018–2020 Champion Kyiv (youth competitions only)
 2020–present AFSC Kyiv

Players

Current squad

Managers

 Anatoliy Sidenko (2020 – 2021)
 Vyacheslav Nivinskyi (2021 – present)

References

External links 
 Official website

Association football clubs established in 2020
2020 establishments in Ukraine
Football clubs in Kyiv
Ukrainian Second League clubs
Sport in Kyiv